Martin Paul (born 2 February 1975) is an English former professional footballer.

Career
Paul began his career as a trainee with Bristol Rovers. He played 29 first-team games before being released in 1996. He joined Doncaster Rovers, but in November 1996 joined Bath City. After initially struggling to establish himself, Paul became a regular goalscorer for Bath, including scoring 30 goals in the 1998–99 season to be the top scorer in the Southern League.

He was sold to Newport County in May 2001 for £3,000, from where he moved to Chippenham Town, again for a four-figure fee, in July 2002. He returned to Bath City in February 2005. However, his second spell with Bath was not as successful as his first and he left to join Mangotsfield United in December 2005.

He was linked with a move to Paulton Rovers in September 2006, and later played for Chippenham before retiring during the 2006–07 season. He did however come out of retirement to play for Bath City in their Errea cup tie against Tiverton Town in January 2007, and began playing in their league side again while on non-contract terms.

In February 2008 he signed again for Chippenham Town.

Post-Retirement
Paul is currently the head coach of the Tyrone Mings Academy, providing football coaching opportunities for children in the South-West and the Midlands.

References

External links

1975 births
Living people
English footballers
Association football forwards
Bristol Rovers F.C. players
Doncaster Rovers F.C. players
Bath City F.C. players
Newport County A.F.C. players
Chippenham Town F.C. players
Mangotsfield United F.C. players
English Football League players
National League (English football) players
Southern Football League players